Raoelina Andriambololona is a Madagascar professor of physics. He was a founding Vice President of African Academy of Sciences, a member of The World Academy of Sciences and he was the founding Director General of National Institute for Nuclear Sciences and Technologies (INSTN), Madagascar.

Early life and education 
Andriambololona was born on May 16, 1936, in Tamatave, Madagascar. He obtained his first degree from University of Madagascar in 1956 and he obtained his doctorate degree from University of Aix Marseilles, Saint-Charles Faculty of Science in 1967.

Research areas 

Andriambololona focuses on Elementary particles physics, Quantum Field Theory,  Relativity, Quantum Mechanics, Nuclear Physics, X-Ray Fluorescence Analysis,  Spectroscopy Analysis of Radioactive and non-radioactive Malagasy ores; Radiation Protection and  Environment

Career 
Andriambololona became a professor in 1977. He was a director of department of Physics in University of Antananarivo. He was also a Dean of the Malagasy Academy,  Former International Atomic Energy Agency National Liaison Officer, founding member and scientific consultant of African regional Agreement (AFRA) in Nuclear Energy since 1989 and he also served as scientific adviser to the President, Madagascar Republic.

Fellowship and membership 
He is an active member of the Third World Academy of Science (TWAS), he was elected in 1985. A member of African Academy of Sciences where he was a  Former founding vice-president of  the association. He was also  elected in the same year. A Member of the New York Academy of Science, U.S.A., American Physical Society, Member of Society of African Physicists and Mathematicians (Accra, Ghana) and the European Physical Society

References 

Madagascar-related lists
Malagasy scientists
African physicists
Founder Fellows of the African Academy of Sciences
Fellows of the African Academy of Sciences
TWAS fellows